The 2005 Vietnamese Second Division was the 5th season of the Vietnamese Second Division, the third tier of the Vietnamese football league system.

League stage

Group A

Group B

5th play-off

Final

References

External links
Official Page

2
2005